The 1954 Washington Senators won 66 games, lost 88, and finished in sixth place in the American League. They were managed by Bucky Harris and played home games at Griffith Stadium.

Offseason 
 November 30, 1953: Al Sima was drafted from the Senators by the Chicago White Sox in the 1953 rule 5 draft.
 Prior to 1954 season: José Valdivielso was acquired by the Senators from the Lubbock Hubbers.

Regular season 
During the season, Carlos Paula became the first black player in the history of the Senators.

Season standings

Record vs. opponents

Notable transactions 
 June 11, 1954: Sonny Dixon was traded by the Senators to the Chicago White Sox for Gus Keriazakos.
 June 18, 1954: Harmon Killebrew was signed as an amateur free agent (bonus baby) by the Senators.
 August 7, 1954: Jim Pearce was purchased from the Senators by the Cincinnati Redlegs.

Roster

Player stats

Batting

Starters by position 
Note: Pos = Position; G = Games played; AB = At bats; H = Hits; Avg. = Batting average; HR = Home runs; RBI = Runs batted in

Other batters 
Note: G = Games played; AB = At bats; H = Hits; Avg. = Batting average; HR = Home runs; RBI = Runs batted in

Pitching

Starting pitchers 
Note: G = Games pitched; IP = Innings pitched; W = Wins; L = Losses; ERA = Earned run average; SO = Strikeouts

Other pitchers 
Note: G = Games pitched; IP = Innings pitched; W = Wins; L = Losses; ERA = Earned run average; SO = Strikeouts

Relief pitchers 
Note: G = Games pitched; W = Wins; L = Losses; SV = Saves; ERA = Earned run average; SO = Strikeouts

Farm system 

Wichita Falls club moved to Sweetwater, May 6, 1954

References

External links 
1954 Washington Senators at Baseball-Reference
1954 Washington Senators team page at www.baseball-almanac.com

Minnesota Twins seasons
Washington Senators season
1954 in sports in Washington, D.C.